18th Tournoi International was a gymnastics competition held in Combs la Ville, France on November 8–9, 2014.

Medal winners
Junior 

Espoir

Result

Junior All-Around

Junior Vault

Junior Uneven Bars

Junior Balance Beam

Junior Floor Exercise

Espoir All-Around

Espoir Vault

Espoir Uneven Bars

Espoir Balance Beam

Espoir Floor Exercise

External links
 Junior Result site
 Espoir Result site 

2014 in gymnastics